Marshall Laverne Bullock II is an American politician who served as a Democratic member of the Michigan Senate from 2019 to 2023

Before being elected to the state legislature, Bullock earned the rank of Eagle Scout. Bullock served as Chair of the Michigan Legislative Black Caucus. Due to redistricting, Bullock and fellow state senator Mallory McMorrow were drawn into the same district, therefore they ran against one another in the 2022 Michigan primary. After leaving the state senate in 2023, Bullock joined the administration of Detroit mayor Mike Duggan as Director of Government Affairs.

References

External links 
 Official Website

Living people
African-American state legislators in Michigan
University of Phoenix alumni
Democratic Party Michigan state senators
21st-century American politicians
Year of birth missing (living people)
21st-century African-American politicians